Schübelbach-Buttikon railway station is a railway station in the Swiss canton of Schwyz and municipality of Schübelbach. The station is located on the Lake Zurich left-bank railway line, owned by the Swiss Federal Railways (SBB).

Layout and connections 
Schübelbach-Buttikon has a  island platform with two tracks ( 1–2). PostAuto Schweiz operates bus services from a stop on Kantonsstrasse, a short distance from the station, to Uznach, Reichenburg, and Pfäffikon.

Services 
 the following services stop at Schübelbach-Buttikon:

References

External links
 
 

Railway stations in the canton of Schwyz
Swiss Federal Railways stations